The prime minister of the Republic of Kosovo is the head of government of Kosovo.

The prime minister and the Government of Kosovo, which they head, are responsible for their actions to the Assembly of Kosovo, of which they must all be members. The current prime minister of Kosovo is Albin Kurti, who assumed office on 22 March 2021.

Officeholders

Socialist Autonomous Province of Kosovo
 Parties

Republic of Kosova (recognised only by Albania)
 Parties

UN-administered Kosovo
 Parties

Republic of Kosovo (as recognised )
 Parties

Deputy Prime Ministers

See also
President of the Presidency of the Socialist Autonomous Province of Kosovo
President of Kosovo
Special Representative of the Secretary-General for Kosovo

References

Notes

External links

The Official website of the Prime Minister of Kosovo

Kosovo
Politics of Kosovo

2002 establishments in Kosovo